Mukur may refer to:

Mukur, Kazakhstan
Mukur, Kyrgyzstan
Muqur, Ghazni in Afghanistan
 Mukura, Odia-language magazine